Bziza is a village in Koura District of Lebanon. There is a well-preserved Roman temple with three of its frontal portico columns still standing. In Byzantine times a two-apse church known as Our Lady of the Columns was built within its walls.

The population is primarily but not exclusively Maronite with some Eastern and Greek Orthodox residents.

References

External links
 Bziza, Localiban

Populated places in the North Governorate
Koura District
Maronite Christian communities in Lebanon